The 1963–64 Danish Cup (Danish: DBUs Landspokalturnering 1963–64) was the 10th installment of the Danish Cup, the national association football cup competition in Denmark. This year's edition began with the regional qualifying rounds among the lower ranking members of the six regional governing bodies in early May 1963, and concluded with the grand cup final on 7 May 1964. A total of 707 clubs participated in the cup tournament – the highest number of teams since the cup's foundation. 671 teams were registered for the qualifying rounds, of which only 44 teams would quality for the proper rounds, under the auspices of the Danish FA's tournament committee, joined by 36 additional teams from the first, second and third divisions in the Danish football league system.

B 1913 were the defending champions of last season, but they were eliminated by Odense KFUM in the semi-finals. Top-flight league club Esbjerg fB won the competition for the first time (despite having reached the 1957 and 1962 finals), beating Odense KFUM of the second-highest division 2–1 in the final at Københavns Idrætspark. The winners qualified for the first round of the 1964–65 European Cup Winners' Cup. Four cup matches were televised, which was allowed as part of the formal agreement worth DKK 250,000 (2003) that Danmarks Radio reached with the Danish FA's business committee on 7 May 1963, and subsequently approved by the Radiorådet. 15 minutes of match highlights from each game – namely the third round game between B 1909 and Esbjerg KFUM, both semi-finals and the cup final – were following the games broadcast on Danmarks Radio's primary news broadcasts, named Aktuelt and Sportsorientering.

Qualifying rounds

All of the teams that entered the competition, but were not playing in the top-flight league, second division and third division, had to compete in the qualifying rounds.

First round proper
All twelve teams from the 1963 Danish 3rd Division entered the cup tournament for the first time joined by the 44 teams that had qualified through the qualifying rounds. One club from the qualifying rounds of the Bornholm FA went on to the proper rounds. Eight clubs from the qualifying rounds of the Copenhagen FA qualified for the proper rounds. Nine member teams of the Zealand FA were transferred from the qualifying rounds to the main cup competition administrated by the Danish FA. Seven teams from the qualifying rounds held under the Funen FA entered the first round proper, but were all eliminated, leaving only the four Odense based teams in the top-flight and second level. Three teams (Holeby IF, Nakskov BK and B 1921) from the Lolland-Falster FA qualified for the proper rounds, while two Lolland-Falster based teams (BK Frem Sakskøbing and B 1901), already present in the divisions, entered in the first round. 16 clubs progressed from the qualifying rounds of the Jutland FA. The 56 teams were administratively split into a western group (vest-kredsen) and an eastern group (øst-kredsen), each consisting of 28 teams, ahead of the draw at the Danish FA's offices on the evening of 22 July 1963.

East Group

West Group

Second round proper
All twelve teams from the Danish 2nd Division entered the cup tournament for the first time. The draw for the round took place in the afternoon at the offices of the Danish FA at Københavns Idrætspark on 19 August 1963.

Third round proper
All twelve teams from the Danish 1st Division entered the cup tournament for the first time. The draw for round three took place on 9 September 1963 17:00 CET at the offices of the Danish FA. The third round matches of the cup, that took place on 23 and 24 November 1963 were all affected by heavy rain, keeping the attendances low and the playing fields damaged. Due to the condition of the grounds, the match between Odense KFUM and Knabstrup IF scheduled to take place at Odense Stadium had to be moved to Odense Athletics Stadium, while the match between B 1901 and AIA was moved from Nykøbing Falster Idrætspark to B 1901's own training ground. The cup match between BK Frem and B 1913 was originally scheduled to take place on Sunday 24 November 1963 at Københavns Idrætspark under floodlight, but the playing field was so badly damaged following Saturday's cup match between Akademisk BK and Kjøbenhavns BK, that the game had to be cancelled Sunday morning. The players and management of the Odense-based team was informed about the cancellation while crossing the Great Belt using the Halsskov-Knudshoved ferry, and hence turned the player's bus around, when they reached the Zealand side to return to their home city. Match highlights from the game between B 1909 and Esbjerg KFUM were broadcast the same evening on Danmarks Radio's primary news broadcast, named Aktuelt.

Fourth round proper
The 16 winners of the third round progressed to the fourth round, that was scheduled to take place on 1 December 1963. The draw for this round took place at the offices of the Danish FA at Københavns Idrætspark in the afternoon of 25 November 1963, following the conclusion of the BK Frem versus B 1913 match. The Randers suburban club Vorup Frederiksberg BK was the only remaining team from a league outside the three top divisional structure, while half of the participants in this round was from the 1963 Danish 1st Division.

Quarter-finals
The eight winners of the previous round progressed to the quarterfinals. The draw for the quarterfinals took place on 1 December 1963, after the conclusion of the BK Frem vs. B 1913 match, and was handled by the board of the Danish FA and its competition's committee. Referee Frede Hansen (Dalum), assigned to the match between Odense KFUM and Aarhus GF, refused have the match played on 8 December 1963 due to a dangerous frost plagued football field and it was postponed to the spring of 1964. B 1909 and Esbjerg fB also both agreed to play their quarterfinal match scheduled for December 1963 in the upcoming spring instead. The first match of the 1964 was originally scheduled to take placed on 22 March at Køge Stadium between Køge BK and B 1913, but was postponed four days due to the weather conditions (large snowdrifts and rim).

Semi-finals
The four winners of the quarter-finals progressed to the semi-finals. The draw for the semifinals took place on 1 March 1964 at the Danish FA's representative cabinet meeting in Aalborg. Match highlights from both semi-finals were broadcast the following evening on Danmarks Radio's primary news broadcast, named Sportsorientering.

Final

Footnotes

References

1963-64
1963–64 domestic association football cups
1963–64 in Danish football